Hazzuwan Halim (born 2 February 1994) is a Singaporean professional footballer who plays as a forward for Singapore Premier League club Hougang United and the Singapore national football team.

Club career

Tanjong Pagar United FC
Hazzuwan signed for Tanjong Pagar United in 2012 for the 2012 S.League season. He stayed in the club until 2013 and made only 3 appearances for the club.

Balestier Khalsa FC
He then signed for Balestier Khalsa in 2014. He was awarded the "Young Player award" at the S-League's annual awards with tough competition from Home United's Irfan Fandi, the Young Lions' Singapore Hami Syahin and Albirex's Yasutaka Yanagi.

Geylang International FC 
On 12 November 2021, Hazzuwan signed for Singapore Premier League side Geylang International FC. He made 26 appearances and contributed to his tenure at Geylang International FC with 5 goals and 2 assists.

Hougang United FC 
On 23 January 2023, Hougang United FC announced their 5th signing, Hazzuwan, for the 2023 SPL season.

International career
Hazzuwan was first called up to the national team in 2019, for the World Cup qualifiers against Yemen and Palestine on 5 September and 10 September respectively. He made his debut against Jordan, replacing Yasir Hanapi in the 67th minute.

Career statistics

Club
. Caps and goals may not be correct.

International statistics

International caps 

As of match played 6 October 2019. Appearances and goals by national team and year

References

External links

1994 births
Living people
Singaporean footballers
Singapore international footballers
Singapore Premier League players
Association football midfielders
Association football forwards
Tanjong Pagar United FC players